Mount Almagosa is the fourth highest peak on island of the United States territory of Guam. It is west of the Fena Valley Reservoir.

References

Almagosa